George the Younger may refer to:

George Bickham the Younger (c. 1706–1771), English etcher and engraver
George Treby (younger) (1726–1761), British politician
George Dance the Younger (1741–1825), English architect and surveyor
George Adams (scientist, died 1795), (1750–1795), English scientist
George Colman the Younger (1762–1836), English dramatist and miscellaneous writer
George Gwilt the younger (1775–1856), English architect and writer on architecture
George Cuitt the Younger (1779–1854), only son of the George Cuitt the Elder
George Boardman the Younger (1828–1903), son of the Baptist missionaries George Dana Boardman and Sarah Hall Boardman
George Murray Smith the Younger (1859–1919), chairman of the Midland Railway
George W. Bush (born 1946), also known as George Bush the Younger, American politician